Emma Sansom (June 2, 1847 – August 9, 1900) was an Alabama farm worker noted for her actions during the American Civil War, during which she assisted the campaign of Confederate Army general Nathan Bedford Forrest. Activists in the 2020 racial protests, including descendants of Sansom herself, called for the removal of a statue commemorating her in Gadsden, Alabama.

Early life 
Sansom was born on June 2, 1847, near Social Circle, Georgia, to Micajah and Levina Vann Sansom, a niece of Cherokee leader James Vann. Around 1852, she and her family moved to a farm just outside Gadsden, Alabama. Her father died in 1858, by which time there were twelve children in her family.

Streight's raid 
In April 1863, Confederate Brig. Gen. Nathan Bedford Forrest was ordered into northern Alabama to pursue Union Colonel Abel Streight, who had orders to cut off the Confederate railroad near Chattanooga, Tennessee. On May 2, 1863, Streight arrived just outside Gadsden and prepared to cross Black Creek. Because the creek was swollen due to rain, Streight realized that if he destroyed the bridge he could get a few hours' respite from the pursuit of Forrest. Seeing the nearby Sansom farmhouse, he rode upon it and demanded some smoldering coal, which he could use to burn the bridge. When Forrest's men arrived at the site, they found the burned out bridge and came under fire from Streight's men.

Forrest rode to the Sansom house and asked whether there was another bridge across the creek. Emma Sansom, then 16 years old, told him that the nearest bridge was in Gadsden, two miles away. Forrest then asked if there was a place where he could get across the creek. Emma told him that if one of his men would help saddle her horse, she would show him a place that she had seen cows cross the creek, and that he might be able to cross there. He replied that there was no time to saddle a horse and asked her to get on his horse behind him. As they started to leave, Emma's mother objected, but relented when Forrest assured her that he would bring the girl back safely. Emma then directed Forrest to the spot where he could cross the river. Some accounts of the skirmish indicate that the two came under fire from Union soldiers, who subsequently ceased fire when they realized that they had been firing on a teenage girl. After taking Emma back to her home, Forrest continued his pursuit of Streight, whom he was able to capture near Cedar Bluff the following day.

Sansom's actions are noteworthy in that openly aiding Confederate forces could have subjected her and her family to prosecution (or even death) from the Union Army.

Later life 
Sansom married Christopher B. Johnson on October 29, 1864, and moved to Texas in late 1876 or early 1877. She died August 9, 1900 in Upshur County, Texas, and is buried in Little Mound Cemetery.

Honors
In 1907, a monument was constructed in Gadsden at the western end of the Broad Street bridge across the Coosa River in honor of her actions. When the residents of Alabama City, Alabama (later annexed into Gadsden) built a high school in 1929, they named it in her honor. With the consolidation of the three Gadsden city high schools at the end of the 2006 school year, General Forrest Middle School was closed and Emma Sansom High School became Emma Sansom Middle School.

Controversy 

In 2020, the statue became a place of conflict between Black Lives Matter protestors and counter-protestors during the wave of racial justice protests triggered by the murder of George Floyd by Minneapolis Police Department officers. The Gadsden city council had debated moving the statue to a nearby cemetery where Confederate soldiers were buried, but voted against it.

Preston Rhea, a descendant of Sansom, wrote a letter signed by thirteen other descendants in support of removing the monument. The Southern Poverty Law Center has identified this statue as one of hundreds of statues constructed by the Lost Cause movement to support white supremacy during the Jim Crow era.

References

 Alabama Department of Archives and History
 Emma Sansom Marker, Social Circle, GA
 Emma Sansom article, Encyclopedia of Alabama
 Wyeth, John Allan. Life of Lieutenant-General Nathan Bedford Forrest. New York and London: Harper and Brothers, 1908. . Retrieved December 2, 2015.

External links
 Monroe F. Cockrell research notes, W.S. Hoole Special Collections Library, The University of Alabama.

1847 births
1900 deaths
People from Gadsden, Alabama
1863 in Alabama
Women in the American Civil War
People of Alabama in the American Civil War
The Lightning Mule Brigade
Nathan Bedford Forrest
People from Walton County, Georgia
Confederate States of America monuments and memorials in Alabama
Confederate States of America monuments and memorials